is a passenger railway station in the town of Ōarai, Ibaraki Prefecture, Japan operated by the third sector Kashima Rinkai Railway.

Lines

Station layout
The station consists of one side platform and one island platform, serving a total of three tracks. The station is staffed.

Platforms

History
The station opened on 14 March 1985 with the opening of the Ōarai Kashima Line.

Passenger statistics
In fiscal 2015, the station was used by an average of 2166 passengers daily.

Surrounding area
 Ōarai town hall
 Ōarai Sun Beach
 Ōarai Marine Tower
 Aqua World
 Ōarai Isosaki Shrine

See also
 List of railway stations in Japan

References

External links

  Kashima Rinkai Testudo Station Information 

Railway stations in Ibaraki Prefecture
Railway stations in Japan opened in 1985
Ōarai, Ibaraki